Leandro Félix Civil Jarvis (born 31 March 1948) is a Cuban former middle distance runner who competed in the 1976 Summer Olympics.

International competitions

References

External links
 

1948 births
Living people
Cuban male middle-distance runners
People from Puerto Padre
Olympic athletes of Cuba
Athletes (track and field) at the 1976 Summer Olympics
Pan American Games medalists in athletics (track and field)
Pan American Games silver medalists for Cuba
Athletes (track and field) at the 1971 Pan American Games
Athletes (track and field) at the 1975 Pan American Games
Athletes (track and field) at the 1979 Pan American Games
Competitors at the 1974 Central American and Caribbean Games
Central American and Caribbean Games gold medalists for Cuba
Central American and Caribbean Games medalists in athletics
Medalists at the 1975 Pan American Games